Carol Larkey Dennis (born 1938) is an author, editor, and teacher.

Biography
Carol Dennis is a graduate of the University of Toledo (B.Ed.), and the University of Houston–Clear Lake (M.S.).

She has had eight books published. Her own books form two series. The oldest one is Dragon's Game, which is six volumes, plus an omnibus of the first three in a hardcover volume called Dragon's Game. The second, currently referred to informally as Guardian's Universe, has had two novels published, Guardian's Gambit & Guardian's Choice.

She is the Senior Editor for Pale Horse Publishing, and operates her own editing service, Lar-Ryk Associates. She has edited at least twelve published books. She has taught at San Jacinto and Angelina colleges, as well as Rice University, the University of Houston–Clear Lake, and Clear Lake High School.

She resides in Trinity, Texas with her husband, Richard.

References

External links
 Carol L. Dennis at isfdb.org

1938 births
Living people
20th-century American novelists
American fantasy writers
University of Toledo alumni
University of Houston–Clear Lake alumni
Rice University faculty
21st-century American novelists
Women science fiction and fantasy writers
American women novelists
20th-century American women writers
21st-century American women writers
Novelists from Texas
People from Trinity, Texas
American women academics